The Complete Stevie Wonder is a digital compilation featuring the work of Stevie Wonder. Released a week before the physical release of A Time to Love, the set comprises almost all of Wonder's officially released material, including single mixes, extended versions, remixes, and Workout Stevie Workout, a 1963 album which was shelved and replaced by With a Song in My Heart. The set also contains a digital (PDF) booklet and three music videos: "Overjoyed", "Part-Time Lover" and "So What the Fuss".

On April 21, 2015, the box set lost its exclusivity rights to iTunes. It was removed from the iTunes store, but is available on other streaming services, and available on FLAC as well.

Disc listing
For more information on each album, go to their respective main articles.

Disc 1: The Jazz Soul of Little Stevie Wonder
Disc 2: Tribute to Uncle Ray
Disc 3: The 12 Year Old Genius (Live)
Disc 4: Workout Stevie Workout (Previously unreleased)
Disc 5: With a Song in My Heart
Disc 6: Stevie at the Beach
Disc 7: Up-Tight
Disc 8: Down to Earth
Disc 9: I Was Made to Love Her
Disc 10: 20th Century Christmas: The Christmas Collection
Disc 11: Eivets Rednow
Disc 12: For Once in My Life
Disc 13: My Cherie Amour
Disc 14: Stevie Wonder Live
Disc 15: Signed, Sealed, and Delivered
Disc 16: Live at the Talk of the Town
Disc 17: Where I'm Coming From
Disc 18: Music of My Mind
Disc 19: Talking Book
Disc 20: Innervisions
Disc 21: Fulfillingness' First Finale
Discs 22 & 23: Songs in the Key of Life
Discs 24 & 25: Journey through the Secret Life of Plants
Disc 26: Hotter than July
Discs 27 & 28: Stevie Wonder's Original Musiquarium
Disc 29: The Woman in Red
Disc 30: In Square Circle
Disc 31: Characters
Disc 32: Jungle Fever
Disc 33: Conversation Peace
Discs 34 & 35: Natural Wonder
Disc 36: A Time to Love

Bonus material
Discs 37-39 - Mono singles
"I Call It Pretty Music But the Old People Call It the Blues, Pt. 1" - 2:32
"I Call It Pretty Music But the Old People Call It the Blues, Pt. 2" - 2:50
"Little Water Boy" - 2:38
"La La La La La" - 2:19
"Contract on Love" - 2:15
"Sunset" - 2:54
"Fingertips, Pt. 1" - 3:20
"Fingertips, Pt. 2" - 3:11
"Work Out Stevie, Work Out" - 2:44
"Monkey Talk" - 2:43
"Castles in the Sand" - 2:11
"Thank You (For Loving Me All the Way)" - 2:56
"Hey Harmonica Man" - 2:33
"This Little Girl" - 2:56
"Happy Street" - 2:26
"Sad Boy" - 2:31
"Pretty Little Angel" - 2:11
"Tears in Vain" - 2:29
"Kiss Me Baby" - 2:14
"High Heel Sneakers" - 3:04
"Funny How Time Slips Away" - 3:49
"Music Talk" - 2:58
"Uptight (Everything's Alright)" - 2:54
"Purple Rain Drops" - 3:08
"Nothing's Too Good for My Baby" - 2:40
"With a Child's Heart" - 3:04
"Blowin' in the Wind" - 3:05
"Ain't That Asking for Trouble" - 2:49
"A Place in the Sun" - 3:10
"Sylvia" - 2:34
"Someday at Christmas" - 2:49
"Travelin' Man" - 2:55
"Hey Love" - 2:55
"I Was Made to Love Her" - 2:38
"Hold Me" - 2:36
"I'm Wondering" - 2:54
"Every Time I See You, I Go Wild!" - 2:52
"Shoo-Be-Doo-Be-Doo-Da-Day" - 2:47
"Why Don't You Lead Me to Love" - 3:11
"You Met Your Match" - 2:43
"My Girl" - 2:56
"Alfie" - 3:13
"More Than a Dream" - 3:39
"For Once in My Life" - 2:48
"Angie Girl" – 3:10
"I Don't Know Why" - 2:48
"My Cherie Amour" - 2:53
"Yester-Me, Yester-You, Yesterday" - 3:04
"I'd Be a Fool Right Now" - 2:53
"Never Had a Dream Come True" - 3:12
"Somebody Knows, Somebody Cares" - 2:34
"Signed, Sealed, Delivered (I'm Yours)" - 2:47
"I'm More Than Happy (I'm Satisfied)" - 2:57
"Heaven Help Us All" - 3:14
"I Gotta Have a Song" - 2:33
"We Can Work It Out" - 2:55
"Never Dreamed You'd Leave in Summer" - 2:54
"If You Really Love Me" - 3:01
"Think of Me as Your Soldier" - 3:38
"What Christmas Means to Me" - 2:30
"Bedtime for Toys" – 3:29

Discs 40-43 - Additional singles and rarities
"I Call It Pretty Music But the Old People Call It the Blues, Pt. 2" (Alternate version) - 5:10
"Don't You Know" (Live at the Apollo) - 3:24
"Fingertips, Pts. 1 & 2" (Live) (Stereo mix) - 6:28
"Lois" - 2:26
"Motor Town Revue Tour Promo" (Promo version) - 0:36
"I Call It Pretty Music But the Old People Call It the Blues" (Live) (Motor Town Revue, Vol. 2) - 2:26
"Moon River" (Live) - 4:51
"Don't You Feel It" - 2:30
"I Gave Up Quality for Quantity" (A Cellarful of Motown! version) - 2:48
"Greetings to the Tamla-Motown Appreciation Society" (Promo version) - 0:42
"High Heel Sneakers" (Live) - 3:29
"Funny How Time Slips Away" (Live) - 4:03
"Fingertips" (Live) - 6:04
"Purple Rain Drops" (Stereo Mix 2005) - 3:18
"I Hear a Symphony" - 2:39
"Are You Sure Love Is the Name of This Game" - 2:36
"Until You Come Back to Me (That's What I'm Gonna Do)" (1977 Looking Back version) - 2:59
"I'm Wondering" (Stereo LP mix) - 2:55
"Travelin' Man" (Stereo LP Mix) - 2:51
"Swing Low Sweet Chariot" - 2:59
"Feeling Good" (Live at Tamla-Motown Festival, Tokyo, Japan, 1968) - 2:22
"A Place in the Sun" (Live at Tamla-Motown Festival, Tokyo, Japan, 1968) - 3:17
"I Was Made to Love Her" (Live at Tamla-Motown Festival, Tokyo, Japan, 1968) - 3:22
"Blowin' in the Wind" (Live at Tamla-Motown Festival, Tokyo, Japan, 1968) - 5:51
"Alfie" (Live at Tamla-Motown Festival, Tokyo, Japan, 1968) - 5:17
"Uptight (Everything's Alright)" (Live at Tamla-Motown Festival, Tokyo, Japan, 1968) - 3:06
"If I Ruled the World" (1968 outtake) - 3:36
"For Once in My Life" (Live) - 3:29
"Shoo-Be-Doo-Be-Doo-Da-Day" (Live) - 4:44
"Uptight (Everything's Alright)" (Live) - 3:06
"Just Enough to Ease the Pain" - 3:07
"I'm Gonna Make You Love Me" (Live with Diana Ross) - 3:45
"Don't Know Why I Love You" (Live) - 3:04
"For Once in My Life" (Live with Diana Ross) - 2:53
"Il Sole E'Di Tutti (A Place in the Sun)" (Italian version) - 3:03
"Passo Le Mie Notti Qui Da Solo (Music Talk)" (Italian version) - 3:00
"Dove Vai (Travelin' Man)" (Italian version) - 2:53
"Non Sono un Angelo (I'm Wondering)" (Italian version) - 3:07
"Se Tu Ragazza Mia (My Girl)" (Italian version) - 3:48
"Solo Te, Solo Me, Solo Noi (Yester-Me, Yester-You, Yesterday)" (Italian version) - 3:02
"My Cherie Amor (My Cherie Amour)" (Italian version) - 2:55
"Mi Ayer, Tu Ayer, el Ayer (Yester-Me, Yester-You, Yesterday)" (Spanish version) - 3:01
"Mi Querido Amor (My Cherie Amour)" (Spanish version) - 2:55
"Por Primera Vez (For Once in My Life)" (Spanish version) - 2:56
"Un Lugar en el Sol (A Place in the Sun)" (Spanish version) - 3:17
"I've Got to Find Him" (WKNR Detroit Radio promo version) - 2:59
"To Know You Is to Love You" (performed by Syreeta) - 6:05
"Boogie On Reggae Woman" (Single version with alternate intro) - 4:53
"Harmour Love" (performed by Syreeta) - 3:39
"Pops, We Love You" (7" single mix; with Diana Ross, Marvin Gaye, Smokey Robinson) - 3:30
"I Ain't Gonna Stand for It" (Single version with alternate ending) - 4:37
"All I Do" (Single version with alternate intro) - 5:16
"Ebony & Ivory" (Duet with Paul McCartney) - 3:42
"Used to Be" (Single version) (performed by Charlene feat. Stevie Wonder) - 4:02
"Stay Gold" - 3:35
"Upset Stomach" (Original long soundtrack version) - 6:34
"You Will Know" (3" CD single version (with interview)) - 4:06
"My Eyes Don't Cry" (7" single version - Verdick mix) - 4:33
"Keep Our Love Alive" (Single version) - 4:01
"Feeding Off the Love of the Land" (B-side single version) - 5:52
"Too High" (with Boyz II Men and Norman Brown) - 5:13
"Dream Come True" (with The Temptations) - 4:15
"Stubborn Kind of Fellow" - 3:02
"Kiss Lonely Good-bye" (Soundtrack version) - 5:03
"Kiss Lonely Good-bye" (Soundtrack orchestral version; without harmonica) - 4:40
"Kiss Lonely Good-bye" (Soundtrack Orchestral Version) [With Harmonica] - 4:40
"Hold On to Your Dream" (1996 song review version) - 4:22
"Hold On to Your Dream" (Orchestral version) - 4:24
"Redemption Song" (Soundtrack version) - 3:48
"True to Your Heart" (with 98°) - 4:16
"If Ever" - 4:47
"To Feel the Fire" - 3:48
"To Feel the Fire" (Alternate gospel version) - 3:43
"Jesus Children of America" (performed by BeBe Winans feat. Stevie Wonder and Marvin L. Winans) - 4:53
"Misrepresented People" - 4:38
"Some Years Ago" - 5:03
"Christmas Song (Chestnuts Roasting on an Open Fire)" (with India.Arie) - 2:42
"Seasons Greetings from Motown" (UK promotional single) - 1:21
"Merry Christmas/Happy Kwanzaa" (UK promotional single) - 0:42
"Merry Christmas and Happy New Year" (UK promotional single) - 0:20
"Happy Holidays" (UK promotional single) - 0:27

Disc 44-48 - Remixes
"Pops, We Love You" (12" disco mix single version; with Diana Ross, Marvin Gaye, Smokey Robinson) - 6:34
"Master Blaster (Jammin')" (12" version) - 6:15
"Master Blaster (Jammin')" (Dub 12" version) - 6:29
"Love Light in Flight" (12" remix) - 6:36
"Love Light in Flight" (12" instrumental remix) - 7:39
"Don't Drive Drunk" (12" version) - 8:21
"Don't Drive Drunk" (12" instrumental remix) - 8:20
"Did I Hear You Say You Love Me" (12" version) - 8:44
"Part-Time Lover" (12" version) - 8:20
"Part-Time Lover" (12" instrumental version) - 8:16
"Go Home" (12" version) - 9:27
"Go Home" (12" instrumental version) - 8:37
"Land of La La" (12" version) - 8:38
"Land of La La" (12" instrumental version) - 8:38
"Skeletons" (12" version) - 6:45
"Skeletons" (12" instrumental version) - 6:43
"Get It" (12" version; with Michael Jackson) - 6:47
"Get It" (12" instrumental version; with Michael Jackson) - 6:46
"My Eyes Don't Cry" (12" version) - 6:35
"My Eyes Don't Cry" (A cappella) - 6:58
"My Eyes Don't Cry" (Dub version) - 7:26
"My Eyes Don't Cry" (Bonus beats) - 3:49
"My Eyes Don't Cry" (12" alternate version - New York City hot mix) - 8:47
"Happy Birthday" (UK 12" version) - 8:11
"Keep Our Love Alive" (12" remix version) - 4:47
"Keep Our Love Alive" (Instrumental remix version) - 4:46
"Gotta Have You" (12" war vocal version) - 8:49
"Gotta Have You" (12" war track version) - 8:47
"Fun Day" (Remix) - 6:31
"Fun Day" (Instrumental remix) - 6:29
"Fun Day" (Club mix) - 6:11
"Fun Day" (A cappella edit) - 1:51
"Cold Chill" (Dance remix) - 6:05
"Cold Chill" (Live) - 7:27
"Cold Chill" (Prince version) - 7:23
"Tomorrow Robins Will Sing" (Wonder West Side "D") - 4:49
"Tomorrow Robins Will Sing" (Ronin Smooth Flavor) - 4:05
"Tomorrow Robins Will Sing" (Wonder West Side version) - 5:23
"Tomorrow Robins Will Sing" (Wonder West Side track) - 5:24
"Tomorrow Robins Will Sing" (A cappella; lead vocals) - 4:45
"Tomorrow Robins Will Sing" (Dance Hall - Mafia & Fluxy) - 5:12
"Tomorrow Robins Will Sing" (Slojungle - Longsy D & Pinky) - 5:23
"Tomorrow Robins Will Sing" (Human rhythm mix radio edit) - 3:55 [mislabel, track is actually "Wonder West Side Edit Short Version"]
"Tomorrow Robins Will Sing" (Human rhythm mix radio edit; with no scratch intro) - 3:46
"Tomorrow Robins Will Sing (Human rhythm remix version with scratch) - 5:14
"Signed, Sealed, Delivered (I'm Yours)" (DJ Smash essential funk mix) - 4:22
"So What the Fuss" (Remix featuring Q-Tip) - 3:34
"So What the Fuss" (Remix featuring Q-Tip with no rap) - 4:04
"So What the Fuss" (Global soul radio mix) - 4:24

Notes to Disk 40-43
Track 1 from Switched on Blues
Track 2 from The Motor-Town Revue, Vol. 1--Live at the Apollo
Track 3 from Cooley High original soundtrack
Tracks 4 & 8 from Never-Before Released Masters From Motown's Brightest Stars
Tracks 6 & 7 from Motortown Revue, Vol. 2
Track 9 from A Cellarful of Motown! Volume 2
Tracks 11-13 from Motortown Revue In Paris
Track 14 from The Motown Box
Track 15 from Motown Sings Motown Treasures
Track 16 from A Cellarful of Motown!
Tracks 17 & 27 from Looking Back - Anthology
Track 18 from Stevie Wonder's Greatest Hits
Track 19 from Stevie Wonder's Greatest Hits Vol. 2
Track 20 from In Loving Memory
Tracks 21-26 from Tamla-Motown Festival Tokyo '68
Tracks 28-30 from Motortown Revue Live
Track 31 from The Complete Motown Anthology
Tracks 32-34 from Motown At The Hollywood Palace
Track 46 aired on WKNR Detroit
Track 47 from Syreeta
Track 48 from 7" single
Track 49 from One to One
Track 50 from single
Tracks 51 & 52 released on 12" single
Track 53 from Tug of War
Track 54 from single
Tracks 55 & 69 from Song Review: A Greatest Hits Collection
Track 56 from Original Soundtrack--Berry Gordy's The Last Dragon
Track 57 from 12" single
Track 58 from single
Track 59 from single
Track 60 from single
Track 61 from Just Between Us
Track 62 from The Music, The Magic, The Memories of Motown: A Tribute to Berry Gordy
Track 63 from Inner City Blues: The Music of Marvin Gaye
Tracks 64-66 from promo CD
Tracks 67 & 68 from Adventures of Pinnochio soundtrack
Track 70 from 98 Degrees and Rising
Track 71 from Ballad Collection
Track 72 from Ballad Collection (Japan)
Track 73 from Ballad Collection (Japan 2 CD expanded)
Track 74 from Love and Freedom
Tracks 75 & 76 from Original Soundtrack -- Bamboozled
Track 77 from Voyage to India (Target exclusive version)
Tracks 78-81 from 1977 promo single

References

2005 compilation albums
ITunes-exclusive releases
Stevie Wonder compilation albums
Motown compilation albums